The M68 is an American 105 mm tank gun. It uses a British-designed L7 gun tube and cartridges with an 
American-designed mount, breech assembly and recoil mechanism.

Technical characteristics 
The M68 differs from the L7 in several aspects :
The M68 uses a concentric recoil spring instead of a separate buffer and recuperator hydraulic cylinders.
The M68 has a cylindrical breech with a vertical sliding breech block instead of a square-shaped breech with a horizontal sliding breech block.
Firing is electrical only.
The M68 barrel is secured to the breech by a tapered pin and interrupted breech threads which allow the barrel to be removed from the gun shield without having to dismantle the mantlet.
The M68 is fitted with an eccentric bore evacuator instead of a concentric model in order to provide more clearance over the rear deck.
The M68 chamber has a difference in the length of its shoulder, producing a different diametral taper near the freebore.

Models 
M68 : initial production variant, used on the original variant of the M60 tank and the M116 gun mount. Retrofitted to the M48A5.
M68E1 : variant used on the M60A1 and M60A3 tanks in mount M140. They were fitted with a fiberglass thermal shroud in 1973. 
M68A1 : improved variant built in 1980 for use on the M1 and IPM1 versions of the M1 Abrams. The M68A1 features an aluminium thermal shroud and a pad for fixing the muzzle reference sensor.
M68A1E4 : a light weight, low-recoil version of the M68A1 designed for the M1128 Mobile Gun System (Stryker MGS). Also designated as M68A2, it features an Ares Incorporated long stroke, low recoil impulse mechanism and a muzzle brake (later removed). The breech is  mounted upside down to accommodate the automatic loader.

Foreign variants 
KM68A1 : licence-produced variant of the US M68A1 gun for the South Korean Army. Used on the South Korean variant of the M48, the M48A5K and K1 tanks.
M68T : Turkish licence-built versions by MKEK under the designation of M68T to up-gun its 90 mm armed M48 fleet, took place in the 1980s.
M64 L71A : Israeli variant built by IMI for the Merkava Mk. I and Mk. 2 tanks.

Prototypes 
T254E1 : US designation for the L7A1, it had the same horizontal sliding breech block as the L7 and used British X15/L52 barrels with a concentric bore evacuator on the barrel.
T254E2 : US variant of the T254, it had a vertical drop breech block with the X15E8 barrel and a concentric bore evacuator. Later standardized as M68. Used in M60 Patton prototype vehicles.
T254E3 : US variant designed in 1975, identical to thee T254E2/M68 but with chrome-plated bores. Only two built.
XM24 : the XM24 gun tube was extended by  compared to the M68A1 and it could tolerate a higher chamber pressure. Designed to replace the 105mm gun M68A1 in the M1 and the IPM1, it was expected to have improved penetration performance, particularly with the upcoming XM900 APFSDS (later cancelled and superseeded by the M900A1). At that time, it was expected that the installation of the enhanced 105 mm gun would be less costly than retrofitting the M1 and IPM1 with the 120 mm gun M256. The program was initiated in March 1983, the Watervliet Arsenal manufactured 14 XM24 tubes and 17 breeches for cannon during the fiscal year 1984. The US Army completed the advanced development phase in February 1984 and initiated it for the M1 in March. Full-scale development was expected to begin in November 1984 for the M60A3 and in January 1985 for the Abrams but the program was abandoned.

Usage 
M1 Abrams: M68A1 cannon used early production models (M1 and IPM1)
M47 Patton: in some upgraded variants
M47M: Iranian modification of US-supplied M47Ms
Sabalan: Iranian modification
Tiam: Iranian modification
M48 Patton: in some upgraded variants
M48A5: US model
Magach 3: Israeli modification
CM-11 Brave Tiger: Taiwanese modification
CM-12 Tank: Taiwanese modification
M48A5K1: South Korean modification
M48A5T1: Turkish modification
M60 tank: M60 and M60A1 using M68, M60A3 using M68E1
 M1128 Mobile Gun System: M68A1E4 cannon
Expeditionary tank
K1 Type 88: KM68A1 cannon
Merkava: Mark I and Mark II models
T-54/55: in some upgraded variants
Tiran-4Sh: Israeli modification of T-54, both L7 and M68 variants fitted
Tiran-5Sh: Israeli modification of T-55, both L7 and M68 variants fitted
Type 72Z: Iranian modernization of T-54/55 and Type 59
Ramses II: Egyptian modernization of T-55

See also 
CN105 F1 (French counterpart)
L7 (British counterpart)
D-10T (Soviet counterpart)
U-5TS (Soviet counterpart)

References

Tank guns of the United States